Roger Pratt, BSC (born 27 February 1947) is a British cinematographer.

Biography
Pratt has been the director of photography for more than 35 films,  including Batman (1989), Frankenstein (1994), 102 Dalmatians (2000), Harry Potter and the Chamber of Secrets (2002), Troy (2004), Harry Potter and the Goblet of Fire (2005), Inkheart (2008) and The Karate Kid (2010). He is a frequent collaborator of directors Terry Gilliam, Roger Christian, and Richard Attenborough.

He was nominated for an Academy Award for Best Cinematography for his work in The End of the Affair.

Pratt is a graduate of London Film School.

Filmography

References

External links 

Living people
British cinematographers
1947 births
Alumni of the London Film School